LaMurriel Page (born September 18, 1975) is a former American college and professional basketball player who was a forward and center in the Women's National Basketball Association (WNBA) for eleven seasons.  Page played college basketball for the University of Florida, and was drafted in the first round of the 1998 WNBA Draft.  She played professionally for the Washington Mystics and the Los Angeles Sparks of the WNBA. Currently, she is an assistant women's basketball coach at Mississippi State.

Early years 

Murriel Page was born  in Louin, Mississippi in 1975.  She attended Bay Springs High School in Bay Springs, Mississippi, where she led her Bay Springs high school basketball team to two state championships.

College career 

Page accepted an athletic scholarship to attend the University of Florida in Gainesville, Florida, where she played for coach Carol Ross's Florida Gators women's basketball team.  At the end of her Gators career, Page was ranked second all-time in points (1,915), rebounds (1,251), field goal percentage (.550), and free throws made (334).  She graduated from the University of Florida with her bachelor's degree in 1998, and was later inducted into the University of Florida Athletic Hall of Fame as a "Gator Great" in 2009.

Florida statistics
Source

USA Basketball
Page competed with USA Basketball as a member of the 1997 Jones Cup Team that won the silver medal in Taipei. Several of the games were close, with the USA team winning four games by six points or fewer, including an overtime game in the semifinal match against Japan. The gold medal game against South Korea was also close, but the USA fell 76–71 to claim the silver medal for the event. Page was the leading scorer for the team, averaging 14.7 points per game.

Professional career 

Page was selected third overall in the first round of the 1998 WNBA Draft by the Washington Mystics, where she played for eight seasons.  In March 2006, Page was traded to the Los Angeles Sparks along with Temeka Johnson in exchange for Nikki Teasley.  During the 2008–2009 WNBA off-season, she played in Spain with Mallorca.  During the 2007–08 off-season she played with San Jose, also in Spain.

College coach 

Following her retirement from professional basketball, Page worked as an assistant coach for the Florida Gators women's basketball team under head coach Amanda Butler beginning with the 2010–11 season until 2016-17. Page then served as an assistant coach at Central Michigan from 2017 to 2020 before joining the Georgia Tech staff in July 2020. In 2022 she joined Sam Purcell's staff at Mississippi State.

WNBA career statistics

Regular season

|-
| style="text-align:left;"|1998
| style="text-align:left;"|Washington
| 30 || 30 || 31.8 || .479 || .000 || .631 || 6.9 || 1.3 || 0.6 || 0.4 || 1.9 || 8.3
|-
| style="text-align:left;"|1999
| style="text-align:left;"|Washington
| 32 || 26 || 28.6 || style="background:#D3D3D3" |.574° || .000 || .683 || 6.7 || 0.9 || 0.8 || 0.9 || 1.5 || 8.8
|-
| style="text-align:left;"|2000
| style="text-align:left;"|Washington
| 32 || 32 || 32.7 || style="background:#D3D3D3" |.590° || .000 || .565 || 6.5 || 2.0 || 0.7 || 1.0 || 2.0 || 9.8
|-
| style="text-align:left;"|2001
| style="text-align:left;"|Washington
| 32 || 32 || 30.9 || .433 || .235 || .583 || 5.5 || 1.7 || 0.9 || 1.1 || 1.9 || 7.0
|-
| style="text-align:left;"|2002
| style="text-align:left;"|Washington
| 32 || 15 || 23.4 || .451 || .500 || .566 || 4.8 || 1.2 || 0.4 || 0.5 || 1.4 || 6.5
|-
| style="text-align:left;"|2003
| style="text-align:left;"|Washington
| 34 || 34 || 25.0 || .377 || .417 || .750 || 4.5 || 1.0 || 0.5 || 0.7 || 1.2 || 6.3
|-
| style="text-align:left;"|2004
| style="text-align:left;"|Washington
| 33 || 19 || 24.5 || .463 || .000 || .550 || 4.2 || 1.1 || 0.8 || 0.5 || 0.9 || 5.6
|-
| style="text-align:left;"|2005
| style="text-align:left;"|Washington
| 34 || 4 || 17.3 || .395 || .273 || 1.000 || 2.4 || 0.7 || 0.4 || 0.3 || 0.7 || 3.2
|-
| style="text-align:left;"|2006
| style="text-align:left;"|Los Angeles
| 34 || 4 || 20.3 || .471 || .000 || .761 || 3.6 || 1.0 || 0.5 || 0.3 || 0.9 || 4.9
|-
| style="text-align:left;"|2007
| style="text-align:left;"|Los Angeles
| 34 || 8 || 18.4 || .418 || .200 || .792 || 3.3 || 1.3 || 0.4 || 0.3 || 0.7 || 4.8
|-
| style="text-align:left;"|2008
| style="text-align:left;"|Los Angeles
| 27 || 1 || 9.0 || .327 || .250 || .667 || 1.3 || 0.5 || 0.2 || 0.0 || 0.4 || 1.6
|-
| style="text-align:left;"|Career
| style="text-align:left;"|11 years, 2 teams
| 354 || 205 || 23.9 || .464 || .259 || .651 || 4.5 || 1.2 || 0.6 || 0.5 || 1.2 || 6.1

Playoffs

|-
| style="text-align:left;"|2000
| style="text-align:left;"|Washington
| 2 || 2 || 34.5 || .444 || .000 || .750 || 3.0 || 0.5 || 1.0 || 0.0 || 2.0 || 5.5
|-
| style="text-align:left;"|2002
| style="text-align:left;"|Washington
| 5 || 0 || 22.6 || .630 || .000 || .933 || 4.4 || 0.8 || 0.2 || 0.8 || 0.6 || 9.6
|-
| style="text-align:left;"|2004
| style="text-align:left;"|Washington
| 3 || 3 || 30.0 || .313 || .000 || .500 || 4.7 || 1.3 || 0.0 || 0.3 || 1.0 || 3.7
|-
| style="text-align:left;"|2006
| style="text-align:left;"|Los Angeles
| 5 || 1 || 23.6 || .310 || .500 || .818 || 4.6 || 0.6 || 0.6 || 0.4 || 0.4 || 5.6
|-
| style="text-align:left;"|2008
| style="text-align:left;"|Los Angeles
| 5 || 0 || 3.0 || .000 || .000 || .500 || 0.0 || 0.2 || 0.0 || 0.2 || 0.0 || 0.2
|-
| style="text-align:left;"|Career
| style="text-align:left;"|5 years, 2 teams
| 20 || 6 || 20.3 || .422 || .500 || .824 || 3.3 || 0.7 || 0.3 || 0.4 || 0.6 || 5.0

See also 

 List of Florida Gators in the WNBA
 List of University of Florida alumni
 List of University of Florida Athletic Hall of Fame members

References

External links 
  Murriel Page – Official WNBA player profile

1975 births
Living people
All-American college women's basketball players
American women's basketball coaches
African-American basketball players
American expatriate basketball people in Spain
American women's basketball players
Basketball players from Mississippi
Centers (basketball)
Central Michigan Chippewas women's basketball coaches
Florida Gators women's basketball coaches
Florida Gators women's basketball players
Los Angeles Sparks players
People from Jasper County, Mississippi
Washington Mystics draft picks
Washington Mystics players
21st-century African-American sportspeople
21st-century African-American women
20th-century African-American sportspeople
20th-century African-American women